Miroslav Orlić (born 13 January 1993) is an Austrian footballer who is last known to have played as a goalkeeper for FK Dinamo Vranje.

Career

In 2009, Orlić signed for Austrian fifth division side Union Henndorf after playing for USV Eggelsberg/Moosdorf in the Austrian sixth division.

In 2010, he signed for Austrian third division club TSV St. Johann. After that, he signed for Zvijezda 09 in the Bosnian second division.

In 2017, Orlić signed for Cypriot team Omonia Aradippou.

In 2018, he signed for UTA in Romania, where he received an offer from Kuwait.

In 2019, Orlić signed for Montenegrin outfit OFK Petrovac.

In 2020, Orlić signed for Dinamo Vranje in the Serbian second division, where he made 10 appearances and scored 0 goals and was accused of match-fixing after throwing the ball into his own goal during a 3–1 win against Železničar (Pančevo).

References

External links
 
 

Austrian expatriate footballers
Austrian expatriate sportspeople in Serbia
Austrian expatriate sportspeople in Cyprus
Austrian expatriate sportspeople in Romania
Austrian expatriate sportspeople in Bosnia and Herzegovina
Association football goalkeepers
Liga II players
Expatriate footballers in Cyprus
Expatriate footballers in Serbia
Expatriate footballers in Romania
Serbian First League players
1993 births
Living people

FK Dinamo Vranje players
OFK Petrovac players
Austrian Regionalliga players
SV Seekirchen players
FC UTA Arad players
Cypriot Second Division players
TSV St. Johann im Pongau players
Omonia Aradippou players
Expatriate footballers in Bosnia and Herzegovina
Expatriate footballers in Montenegro
Austrian footballers
ENAD Polis Chrysochous players
Austrian expatriate sportspeople in Montenegro